Hans Bohn (December 23, 1891 – May 10, 1980) was a German graphic artist and typographer.  He developed the fonts Orplid, Mondial, Allegro, and the heavier weight of Kuenstler Script.

After training at the Technische Lehranstalt in Offenbach, he began his professional career at the Ullstein Verlag in Berlin in 1914. From 1919 to 1930, he worked at the Klingspor Foundry. Afterwards he was a freelance graphic designer. He produced fonts and graphic arts for Ludwig & Mayer, a major German foundry, in the 1930s. In the 1950s, he produced the Kuenstler font for the Stempel foundry .

See also
Kuenstler Script

References

External links
Kuenstler Font at Adobe: 

1891 births
1980 deaths
German typographers and type designers
German graphic designers